Benjamin Church (August 24, 1734 – 1778) was effectively the first Surgeon General of the United States Army, serving as the "Chief Physician & Director General" of the Medical Service of the Continental Army from July 27, 1775, to October 17, 1775. He was also active in Boston's Sons of Liberty movement in the years before the war. However, early in the American Revolution, Church was also sending secret information to General Thomas Gage, the British commander, and when one of his letters into Boston was intercepted, he was tried and convicted of "communicating with the enemy". He was jailed but eventually released, likely dying somewhere in the Caribbean Sea in 1778.

Biography

Family and education
Church was born in Newport, Colony of Rhode Island, the son of Benjamin Church, a merchant of Boston and deacon of the Hollis Street Church conducted by the Rev. Mather Byles.  His great-grandfather, Colonel Benjamin Church, took a prominent part in the war with the Narragansett Indians and led the force which hunted King Philip to his death on August 12, 1676. Church (the third Benjamin Church) was a Mayflower descendant through his great-great-grandmother Elizabeth Warren Church, who was the daughter of Richard Warren, one of the Mayflower passengers. Benjamin's sister Alice married Boston printer John Fleeming.

The third Benjamin attended the Boston Latin School and graduated from Harvard College in 1754. He studied medicine with Joseph Pynchon, later continuing his studies in London. While there, he married Hannah Hill of Ross, Herefordshire. Returning to Boston he built up a reputation as a talented physician and a skillful surgeon.  Church performed cataract surgery, and is also remembered for treating the eye ailments of John Adams.

Political ambiguities
With growing friction between the colonies and Great Britain, Church supported the Whig cause vigorously with his pen.  There is evidence that during this period he was variously considered as an ardent Patriot and as a secret Tory sympathizer.  He examined the body of Crispus Attucks and treated some of the wounded in the Boston Massacre on March 5, 1770. In 1773, he delivered the annual Massacre Day oration, To Commemorate the Bloody Tragedy of the Fifth of March 1770, which marked him as an orator of high order.

In 1774, Church was elected a delegate to the Massachusetts Provincial Congress and later made a member of its Committee of Safety, which was in charge of preparing for armed conflict. Around the same time, Gen. Gage began receiving detailed intelligence on the Provincial Congress's activities. On February 21, 1775, the Provincial Congress appointed Church and Joseph Warren a committee to make an inventory of medical supplies necessary for the army and, on March 7, voted them the sum of five hundred pounds for the purchase of such supplies.

On May 8, 1775, after the Revolutionary War had begun, Church became a member of an examining board for surgeons for the army. A June 19 resolution ordered "that Dr. Church, Dr. Taylor, and Dr. Whiting be a committee to consider what method is proper to take to supply the hospitals with surgeons and that the same gentlemen be a committee to provide medicine and other necessaries for hospitals."  As the chairman of a subcommittee of the Committee of Safety, he signed a report on May 12 which recommended a system of defensive works on Prospect Hill and Bunker Hill.  Colleagues noted, however, that he had insisted on entering Boston soon after the Battle of Lexington and Concord, and while there he was seen in conference with British General Thomas Gage; he claimed to have been arrested and released.

Director General
In May, Church went to Philadelphia, Pennsylvania, to consult the Continental Congress about the defense of Massachusetts colony. On July 27, that body authorized the establishment of a Medical Department of the Army with a Director General and Chief Physician who would be head of both the Hospital Department of the first Army Hospital and of the first headquarters of regimental surgeons (located in the Henry Vassall House, Cambridge, MA). In the meantime, on July 2, General George Washington had arrived at Cambridge to take command of the colonial forces, and Church was one of the committee appointed to receive him.

Church had difficulty administering his department, and the regimental surgeons. A storm of complaints poured into Army headquarters, and Washington was compelled to order an investigation of the Medical Service. In his own defense, Church complained that rivals were jealous of his position and reportedly asked for permission to leave the Army. In the meantime, an incident arose which brought him before an Army court martial on October 4, 1775.

"Criminal correspondence" and court martial
In July 1775, Church had sent a cipher letter addressed to a Major Cane, a British officer in Boston, through a former mistress. The letter was intercepted by another of the woman's ex-lovers, and was sent to Washington in September. When two teams of gentlemen decoded it, they found it contained an account of the American forces before Boston, though no disclosures of great importance. It did, however, declare Church's devotion to the Crown, and it asked for directions for continuing the correspondence.

The matter was placed before a court of inquiry made up of general officers, Washington presiding, to whom Church admitted the authorship of the letter, but explained that it was written with the object of impressing the enemy with the strength and position of the colonial forces in order to prevent an attack while the Continental army was still short of ammunition and in hopes of aiding to bring about an end to hostilities. The court considered that Church had carried on a criminal correspondence with the enemy and recommended that the matter be referred to the Continental Congress for its action. The report of Washington to the President of Congress stated:

Church was briefly incarcerated in a room of the Henry Vassall House in Cambridge, where his carved name can be seen today.

The Massachusetts Provincial Congress arraigned Church on November 2. Despite an eloquent appeal in his own defense, he was unanimously expelled as a member of the House. The Continental Congress on October 17, 1775, elected John Morgan "in the room of" Church, and on November 7 passed the following resolution:

In accordance with this resolution, Church was confined at Norwich, Connecticut. Becoming ill, he was released from jail in January 1776, and was permitted considerable movement under guard. On May 13, he returned to Massachusetts under bond. He remained imprisoned until 1778, and was named in the Massachusetts Banishment Act of that year. Shortly thereafter he sailed from Boston, presumably for Martinique, but the vessel on which he took passage was never heard from again.

Assessment
When scholars were able to open General Gage's files early in the 20th century, they discovered earlier letters with significant intelligence about the American forces that could only have come from Church.  The files included notes that had been entrusted to him to carry into and out of Boston. Until then, historians had had difficulty estimating the degree of Church's guilt. It is now clear that he was supplying the British military with information in early 1775.

Church's widow and family were pensioned by the British government.

Popular culture
In the video game Assassin's Creed III, Church is portrayed as member of the antagonistic Templars. He later betrays the Templars by supplying information to the British, counter to the Order's current plans.
Church appears as a character in the novel Thieftaker by D. B. Jackson in which he examines the titular character.

See also
Intelligence in the American Revolutionary War
Intelligence operations in the American Revolutionary War
List of people who disappeared mysteriously at sea

References

Further reading
 Nagy, John A. Dr. Benjamin Church, Spy: A Case of Espionage on the Eve of the American Revolution. 2013. .
 Parts of this article were originally based on public domain text produced by the U.S. government.
 Allen French, General Gage's Informers (1932).

1770s missing person cases
1778 deaths
18th-century American physicians
American Loyalists from Massachusetts
British spies during the American Revolution
Continental Army personnel who were court-martialed
Continental Army staff officers
Expelled members of the Massachusetts House of Representatives
Harvard College alumni
Harvard College Loyalists in the American Revolution
People from colonial Boston
People lost at sea
Physicians in the American Revolution
Prisoners and detainees of Connecticut
Surgeons General of the United States Army